The 2008 Ukrainian Figure Skating Championships took place between December 18 and 20, 2007 in Kyiv. Skaters competed in the disciplines of men's singles, ladies' singles, pair skating, and ice dancing on the senior level. The results of the national championships were used to choose the teams to the 2009 World Championships and the 2009 European Championships.

Results

Men

Ladies

Pairs

Ice dancing

External links
 results

Ukrainian Figure Skating Championships
Ukrainian Figure Skating Championships, 2008
2007 in figure skating
2007 in Ukrainian sport
2008 in Ukrainian sport